Leptogyra costellata is a species of sea snail, a marine gastropod mollusk in the family Melanodrymiidae.

Description

Distribution
This species occurs at methane seeps in deep water off the Congo River.

References

Melanodrymiidae
Gastropods described in 2009